Faddeyevsky, also known as Faddeyevsky Island, is a large peninsula in the New Siberian Islands, Sakha Republic, Russia.

This geographic feature was named after a fur trader called Faddeyev who built the first settlement there.

Geography
It was formerly recognized as an island, but it is geographically part of Kotelny Island. The peninsula projects from the northern end of Bunge Land eastwards with its isthmus in the north. There is a deep inlet on Faddeyevski between its western coast and adjoining Bunge Land.

Faddeyevsky is covered with tundra vegetation and dotted with small lakes.

Unlike neighboring Kotelny this peninsula is relatively flat despite its size, its highest point being only 65 m. Its area is 5,300 km2.

See also
Anzhu Islands

References 

Peninsulas of Russia
Former islands of Russia
Anzhu Islands
Landforms of the Sakha Republic